El Dorado is the debut studio album by American rapper 24kGoldn. It was released on March 26, 2021, by Records, LLC and distributed by Columbia Records. It follows his debut extended play and project, Dropped Outta College, which was released in late 2019. The album features guest appearances from DaBaby, Future, Swae Lee, and Iann Dior.  The album was certified Gold by the RIAA in the United States in July 2021 for selling 500,000 units in the country.

Background 
The album's title was confirmed by the singer in September 2020, while the album's lead single "Mood" reached its peak success. On March 15, 2021, he revealed the album's tracklisting in a video. Four days later, he announced the album's release date along with revealing the cover art. That same day, he also teased a deluxe edition of the album by responding to a fan's comment on TikTok. He toured in support of the album; the El Dorado Tour began on November 2, 2021, and ended on January 27, 2022.

Singles
The album was preceded by three singles. The lead single, "Mood", featuring Puerto Rican rapper Iann Dior, was released on July 24, 2020, and would go on to achieve success on several charts worldwide.  In September 2020, while the song was in the top 10 in both the United States and United Kingdom, 24kGoldn announced that an album would follow the single.  The second single, "Coco", featuring American rapper DaBaby, was released on December 4, 2020.  The third single, "3, 2, 1", was released on February 19, 2021.

Following the release of the album, "Love or Lust" was sent to contemporary hit radio in Italy on April 23, 2021, as the album's fourth single. The following week, "Company", featuring American rapper Future, was sent to rhythmic contemporary radio in the United States on April 27, 2021, as the album's fifth single.

Track listing
Credits adapted from Tidal.

Personnel
Credits adapted from Tidal.

Musicians

 Omer Fedi – guitar , bass , keyboards , programming 
 94Skrt – drums 
 Kaash Paige – background vocals 
 Nick Mira – drums 
 Blake Slatkin – guitar , bass , programming 

Technical

 24kGoldn – executive producer
 Omer Fedi – executive producer
 Dale Becker – mastering engineer 
 Chris Gehringer – mastering engineer 
 Manny Marroquin – mixing engineer 
 Robin Florent – mixing engineer 
 Serban Ghenea – mixing engineer 
 John Hanes – mixing engineer 
 Hector Vega – engineer 
 Fili Filizzola – engineer 
 Connor Hedge – engineer 
 Blake Slatkin – engineer , recording engineer  
 Ryan Adam Cantu – engineer, recording engineer 
 Donn Robb – recording engineer 
 Louis Bell – recording engineer 
 94Skrt – recording engineer 
 Ilya – recording engineer 
 Jeremie Inhaber – assistant engineer 
 Chris Galland – assistant engineer

Charts

Weekly charts

Year-end charts

Certifications

References

2021 debut albums
Columbia Records albums